Potamonautes montivagus is a species of freshwater crustacean in the family Potamonautidae. It is native to southeastern Africa. Its natural habitat is rivers.

Range and habitat
Potamonautes montivagus is found in mountain streams in southwestern Tanzania, northern  and southeastern Malawi, western Mozambique, eastern Zambia, and eastern Zimbabwe.

Its native habitat is high-elevation rivers, streams, and lakes.

References

Arthropods of Malawi
Arthropods of Mozambique
Arthropods of Tanzania
Invertebrates of Zambia
Arthropods of Zimbabwe
Potamoidea
Freshwater crustaceans of Africa
Crustaceans described in 1953
Taxonomy articles created by Polbot